These are the late night schedules on all three networks for each calendar season beginning September 1985. All times are Eastern/Pacific.

Talk/variety shows are highlighted in yellow, network news programs in gold, and local news & programs are highlighted in white background.

Monday-Friday

Saturday

Sunday

By network

ABC

Returning Series
Eye on Hollywood
Nightline

New Series
Lifestyles of the Rich and Famous (also aired in Daytime)

Not Returning From 1984-85
ABC Rocks

CBS

Returning Series
CBS Late Night
CBS News Nightwatch
T.J. Hooker (Moved from ABC, previously a primetime series)

NBC

Returning Series
Friday Night Videos
The George Michael Sports Machine
Late Night with David Letterman
Saturday Night Live
The Tonight Show Starring Johnny Carson

United States late night network television schedules
1985 in American television
1986 in American television